Mark Campbell is a New York-based librettist and lyricist whose operas have received both a Pulitzer Prize in Music and a GRAMMY Award. Mark began writing for the stage as a musical theatre lyricist, but turned to libretto-writing after he premiered Volpone, his first full-length opera in 2004 at Wolf Trap Opera Company.

Mark has written 40 opera librettos, lyrics for 7 musicals and text for 6 song cycles and 4 oratorios. His best-known works are Silent Night, The Shining, The (R)evolution of Steve Jobs, As One, Later the Same Evening, Stonewall, Elizabeth Cree and the musical Songs from an Unmade Bed. His operas have been produced by most of the prominent opera companies in the U.S., including Atlanta Opera, Arizona Opera, Austin Opera, Boston Lyric Opera, Central City Opera, Chicago Opera Theatre, Cincinnati Opera, Des Moines Metro Opera, Ft. Worth Opera, Houston Grand Opera, Hawaii Opera Theatre, Lyric Opera of Kansas City, Michigan Opera Theatre, Minnesota Opera, New Orleans Opera, New York City Opera, Opera Colorado, Opera Memphis, Opera Parallèle, Opera Philadelphia, Pensacola Opera, Pittsburgh Opera, Portland Opera, San Diego Opera, San Francisco Opera, Santa Fe Opera, Seattle Opera, Urban Arias, Utah Opera, Virginia Opera, Washington National Opera and West Edge Opera.

As an educator, Mark has established libretto-writing programs at the American Opera Project, Washington National Opera's American Opera Initiative, American Lyric Theatre and the University of Colorado's New Opera Workshop. In 2022, he created the Campbell Opera Librettist Prize, the first and only award for opera librettists in the history of the art form (administered by OPERA America).  In 2022, he co-created, with his As One collaborators, the True Voice Award to help with the training of transgender and non-binary singers (administered by Washington National Opera's Cafritz Young Artist's Program).

Operas (librettos)

Musicals (lyrics)

Oratorios (text)

Song cycles (lyrics) 

 Thoroughfare  Music by Conrad Cummings
 Eight Phases of Luna  Music by Kamala Sankaram
 Dear Mayor  Music by Mark Baechle
 And Another Song Comes On  Music by Ben Moore
 Six Christmas Traditions  Music by Jake Heggie
 Some Favored Nook  Music by Eric Nathan
 The Nothing Lamp Music by Joseph N. Rubinstein
 A Year to the DayA dramatic song cycle for tenor, violin, cello and piano Lembit Beecher The Violin Channel

Awards and nominations 

2019 GRAMMY Award for Best Opera Recording (The (R)evolution of Steve Jobs)
 2012 Pulitzer Prize in Music for Silent Night
 Dominic J. Peliciotti Opera Award, A Letter to East 11th Street
New York State Council on the Arts Award, Today It Rains
Hewlett Foundation Award, Today It Rains
 First recipient of the Kleban Foundation Award for Lyricist
 2007 GRAMMY Award nomination for Best Opera Recording for Volpone
 Three Drama Desk Award nominations
Jonathan Larson Performing Arts Foundation Award
New York Foundation for the Arts Playwriting Fellowship
 Two Richard Rodgers Awards from the American Academy of Arts and Letters
Multi-Arts Production (MAP) Fund Grant
Sundance Institute Theatre Lab Alumnus, Sundance Institute at Ucross Writer's Retreat, MacDowell Colony Fellow, Hermitage Artists Retreat Fellow

Libretto mentorship programs

Mark Campbell has created or helped create opera libretto-writing programs with the following organizations: 
 The American Opera Project Composers & The Voice
American Lyric Theatre The American Opera Initiative
University of Colorado New Opera Workshop Opera Philadelphia's Composer in Residence Program   The John Duffy Institute for New Opera

Recordings 

 Volpone  Wolf Trap Recordings
 Music Awake! Choral Music of Paul Moravec  Bach Festival of Winter Park Recordings
 The Inspector  Wolf Trap Recordings
 Later the Same Evening  Albany Records
 Bastianello/Lucrezia  Bridge Records
 Songs from an Unmade Bed  Ghostlight Records/Sh-k-boom Records
 Rappahannock County  Naxos
 The (R)evolution of Steve Jobs  Pentatone
 As One  Bright Shiny Things
 Sanctuary Road  Naxos
 Silent Night Naxos
 New Words (Andrea Marcovicci)  Cabaret Records
 Greenwich Time (Rebecca Luker)  PS Classics
 Kiss Me While We Have the Chance (Steve Marzullo)  Yellow Sound
 In Celebration of Life  Abrams Gentile 
 Broadway Bound (Sarah Jessica Parker/Matthew Broderick)  Varèse Sarabande

References

External links 
 

Year of birth missing (living people)
Living people
American opera librettists
American musical theatre librettists